Leelan is a village in Faisalabad district, situated on the south-west of Faisalabad 37 km (25 km straight line) from Faisalabad Clock Tower. The population of the village is 5,000 (approximately). The major source of income is agriculture. Saag and Halwa Poori are the traditional dishes of Leelan. Urs of Sian Sadiq Shah is celebrated on 24th of Assu (coinciding with the months of September and October) according to vernacular calendar. The village has a lower literacy rate.

References

Villages in Faisalabad District